The Restraining Acts of early 1775 were two Acts passed by the Parliament of Great Britain, which limited colonial trade in response to both increasing and spreading civil disobedience in Massachusetts and New England, and similar trade restrictions instituted by elected colonial representatives. With time the foment would spread to most of its American Colonies. The first restraining act, (15 Geo. III c. 10) known variously as the New England Trade And Fisheries Act, the New England Restraining Act, or the Trade Act 1775, limited the export and import of any goods to and from only Great Britain, Ireland, and the British West Indies; it also prohibited the New England colonies from fishing in the waters off Newfoundland and most of America's Atlantic coast, without special permissions and documentation, and imposed stiff penalties on both perpetrators and administrators if violations occurred. Previously legal or finessed trade between the colonies themselves or with other nations was prohibited, and enforced by naval blockade, effective July 1, 1775.  The second restraining act, (15 Geo. III c. 18) known also as the Trade Act 1775, similarly limited the export or import of any goods by way of only Great Britain, Ireland, and the British West Indies for most colonies south of New England; it was passed shortly after the first, upon receiving news in April that the colonial's trade boycott had spread widely among other colonies. Only New York, Delaware, North Carolina and Georgia would escape these restraints on trade, but only for a few months.

The Restraining Acts were passed one year after the first of the Intolerable Acts had been imposed to show the potential of tighter British sovereignty over Boston, Massachusetts, and threatened the same treatment in other colonies generally. Instead of quieting the populace, these coercive laws had been met with increasing resistance and rising resentment among the colonials. Over this same period the colonies established independent communications, and the First Continental Congress established the colonial's boycott to restrain the import of British goods then the export of colonial products, which caused disruption in British trade and revenues and shortages in the colonies themselves. Additionally, the colonies had established alternative legislatures in defiance of established ones under direct imperial control. The growing defiance caused a mutual scramble for munitions and treasonous acts to obtain them, indicating that more violence was on the horizon. News arriving about the first restraining act, and related actions of the Massachusetts military governor would lead directly to the first military confrontation in the American Revolutionary War.

With fighting started, any possible reconciliation became moot, and the King would issue his Royal Proclamation of Rebellion in August. In December 1775 Parliament passed the Prohibitory Act prohibiting any trade with all the colonies, and enforcing it with a tighter blockade and more severe penalties; it was a declaration of economic war, with inbound or outbound ships, mariners and cargoes treated as if they "were the ships and effects of open enemies ... [to be] so adjudged, deemed, and taken, in all courts." With this drastic change in British tactics, effective January 1, 1776, the two Restraining Acts as well as the Boston Port Act were repealed, "whereas the prohibitions and restraints imposed by the said acts will be rendered unnecessary by the provisions of this act."

Rebellion proclaimed
The province of Massachusetts Bay was in a state of crisis following the passage of the Coercive Acts in 1774. When colonists formed the extra-legal Massachusetts Provincial Congress and began organizing militia units independent of British control, Parliament responded on February 9, 1775, by declaring that Massachusetts was in a state of rebellion.

The joint resolution of Parliament read, in part:

One of the Coercive Acts, the Boston Port Act, had cut off Boston's trade; this blockade was now extended to all of Massachusetts.

New England Restraining Act
The North ministry next turned its attention to New England generally. The New England Restraining Act (short title: New England Trade And Fisheries Act, 15 Geo. III c. 10) was the ministry's response to the American colonies' decision to boycott British goods, as embodied in the Continental Association of 1774. It was given royal assent by George III on March 30, 1775. The Act provided that New England's trade be limited to Britain and the British West Indies (trade with other nations was prohibited, effective July 1, 1775). Moreover, New England ships were barred from the North Atlantic fisheries (a measure that pleased British Canadians, but threatened considerable harm to New England's economy), effective July 20, 1775.

Restraining Act extended
In April 1775, after news was received in London that colonies outside of New England had joined the Continental Association, a second restraining Act was passed to include the colonies of Pennsylvania, New Jersey, Virginia, Maryland and South Carolina. New York, Delaware, North Carolina, and Georgia were not included because the North ministry mistakenly believed that those colonies were opposed to the colonial boycott.

Notes

References

Bibliography
Cogliano, Francis D. Revolutionary America, 1763–1815: A Political History. Routledge, 1999.
Jensen, Merrill. The Founding of a Nation: A History of the American Revolution, 1763–1776. New York: Oxford University Press, 1968.

External links
Text of the New England Restraining Act
Text of the Southern Colonies Restraining Act

Great Britain Acts of Parliament 1775
1775 in the Thirteen Colonies
History of New England
British laws relating to the American Revolution